The 1977 UMass Minutemen football team represented the University of Massachusetts Amherst as a member of the Yankee Conference during the 1977 NCAA Division II football season. Led by Dick MacPherson in his seventh and final season as head coach, the Minutemen compiled an overall record of 8–3 with a mark of 5–0 in conference play, winning the Yankee Conference title. UMass advanced to the NCAA Division II Football Championship playoffs, losing in the quarterfinals to the eventual national champion, Lehigh. The team played home games at Alumni Stadium in Hadley, Massachusetts.

The 1977 season was the last in which UMass competed at the NCAA Division II level, as the Yankee Conference movde to the NCAA's newly-formed Division I-AA—now known at the Football Championship Subdivision (FBS)—in 1978.

Schedule

References

UMass
UMass Minutemen football seasons
Yankee Conference football champion seasons
Umass Minutemen football